Tarr Chronicles is a space combat simulation game developed by Quazar Studio and Akella and published by Paradox Interactive (AUS) and cdv Software. The game was released in 2007.

Tarr Chronicles initially debuted with incomplete joystick support.  The game appeared to be released (and apparently designed) with the mouse and keyboard as the primary control system. The 1.0.6.0 patch however introduces joystick axis mapping to any game actions.

Reception 

The game received "mixed" reviews according to video game review aggregator Metacritic.

Sequel 
 Dark Horizon

References

External links

Official website

2007 video games
Space combat simulators
Video games developed in Russia
Windows games
Windows-only games
CDV Software Entertainment games
Single-player video games
Paradox Interactive games
Akella games